Selma may refer to:

Places
Selma, Algeria
Selma, Nova Scotia, Canada
Selma, Switzerland, village in the Grisons

United States:
Selma, Alabama, city in Dallas County, best known for the Selma to Montgomery marches
Selma, Arkansas
Selma, California, city in Fresno County
Selma, Colorado
Selma, Indiana, town in Delaware County
Selma, Iowa
Selma, Kansas
Selma, Louisiana
Selma, Michigan
Selma, Mississippi
Selma, Missouri
Selma, North Carolina, town in Johnston County
Selma, Ohio
Selma, Oregon, unincorporated community in Josephine County
Selma, South Carolina
Selma, Texas, a city in Bexar, Comal, and Guadalupe counties
Selma, Virginia
Selma Township (disambiguation), various

Historic buildings
Selma Union Depot, a train station and museum in Selma, North Carolina
Selma (Eastville, Virginia), a plantation house listed on the U.S. National Register of Historic Places (NRHP)
Selma (Leesburg, Virginia), a mansion and former plantation property
Selma (Winchester, Virginia), home of Virginia Senator James M. Mason, destroyed by Union troops in 1863. A subsequent more modest home on the same site still uses the name.

Other uses
Selma (name), a given name and a surname
Selma (film), a 2014 film based on the Selma to Montgomery marches
"Selma" (Bijelo Dugme song), 1974
Selma (gastropod), a genus of sea snails
Selma (lake monster), in folklore, a sea monster in Seljord, Norway
Selma to Montgomery marches, three marches that marked the political and emotional peak of the American civil rights movement